Huang Jialing (born 3 August 1982 in Guangzhou, Guangdong) is a female Chinese foil fencer. She competed at the 2008 Summer Olympics.

Major performances
 1995 Guangzhou Sports School
 2002 Guangdong Sports College
 2005/2007 National Team

See also
 China at the 2008 Summer Olympics

External links
 Huang Jialing at 2008teamchina.olympic.cn
 

1982 births
Living people
Chinese female fencers
Fencers at the 2008 Summer Olympics
Olympic fencers of China
Asian Games medalists in fencing
Fencers at the 2006 Asian Games
Asian Games silver medalists for China
Medalists at the 2006 Asian Games
Fencers from Guangzhou
21st-century Chinese women